Torello, an Italian word meaning small or young bull, may refer to:

Places

Italy
Masi Torello, a municipality of the Province of Ferrara, Emilia-Romagna
Torello, a civil parish of Castel San Giorgio, Province of Salerno, Campania
Torello, a civil parish of Marmora, Province of Cuneo, Piedmont
Torello, a civil parish of Marzano Appio, Province of Caserta, Campania
Torello, a civil parish of Melizzano, Province of Benevento, Campania
Torello, a civil parish of Mercato San Severino, Province of Salerno, Campania
Torello, a civil parish of Montecorvino Pugliano, Province of Salerno, Campania
Torello, a civil parish of Ravello, Province of Salerno, Campania
Torello, a civil parish of San Leo, Province of Rimini, Emilia-Romagna
Torello, a civil parish of Valle Mosso, Province of Biella, Piedmont

Spain
Torelló, a municipality in the Province of Barcelona, Catalonia
Sant Pere de Torelló, a municipality in the Province of Barcelona, Catalonia
Sant Vicenç de Torelló, a municipality in the Province of Barcelona, Catalonia

People 
Agustí Torelló (1863–1932), Catalán violinist, conductor, composer and music teacher
Anton Torello (1884–1960), Catalan double bass player
Flavio Torello Baracchini (1892–1928), Italian aviator and inventor
James Vincent "Turk" Torello (1930–1979), Italian-American mobster 
Juan Antonio Samaranch Torelló (b. 1920), Spanish sports official and politician

See also

Torella (disambiguation)
Torelli (disambiguation)
Toro (disambiguation)